The Ministry of Plantation and Commodities is a ministry of the Government of Malaysia that is responsible for overseeing the development of the main commodities of Malaysia which are palm oil, rubber, timber, furniture, cocoa, pepper, kenaf and tobacco. 

This ministry was formerly known as the Ministry of Plantation Industries and Commodity (MPIC) before its name was changed in 2022.

Overview
The plantation and commodities sector has contributed significantly to the country’s economic development for the past 50 years. Since then, the sector has become one of Malaysia’s major exports earnings. Exports values of these commodities and commodity-based products in 2012 was RM 127.5 billion, constituted 18.2 per cent of total export earnings.

In 2012,  Kementerian Perusahaan Perladangan dan Komoditi (KPPK) was rebranded to the Ministry of Plantation Industries and Commodities (MPIC).

In 2018, the name was changed again, to the Ministry of Primary Industries (MPI).

In 2020, MPI was renamed again to the Ministry of Plantation Industries and Commodities (MPIC).

Organisation
Minister
Deputy Minister (I)
Deputy Minister (II)
Secretary-General
Legal Advisory
Internal Audit Unit
Corporate Communication Unit
Integrity Unit
Deputy Secretary-General (Plantation and Commodities)
Palm Oil and Sago Industry Development Division
Timber, Tobacco and Kenaf Industries Development Division
Rubber and Jatropha Industry Development Division
Cocoa and Pepper Industry Development Division
Biofuel Division
Deputy Secretary General (Strategic Planning and Management)
Strategic Planning and International Division
Innovation Promotion and Industrial Human Capital Division
Administration, Development and Financial Management Division
Human Resource Management Division
Information Management Division

Federal agencies
 Malaysian Palm Oil Board (MPOB), or Lembaga Minyak Sawit Malaysia. (Official site)
 Malaysian Rubber Board (MRB), or Lembaga Getah Malaysia (LGM). (Official site)
 Malaysian Timber Industry Board (MTIB), or Lembaga Perindustrian Kayu Malaysia. (Official site)
 Malaysian Cocoa Board (MCB), or Lembaga Koko Malaysia. (Official site)
 National Kenaf and Tobacco Board (LKTN), or Lembaga Kenaf dan Tembakau Malaysia (LKTN). (Official site)
 Malaysian Pepper Board (MPB), or Lembaga Lada Malaysia. (Official site)
 Malaysian Palm Oil Certification Council (MPOCC), or Majlis Persijilan Minyak Sawit Malaysia. (Official site)
 Malaysian Palm Oil Council (MPOC), or Majlis Minyak Sawit Malaysia.
 Malaysian Rubber Export Promotion Council (MREPC), or Majlis Promosi Eksport Getah Malaysia. (Official site)
 Malaysian Timber Council (MTC), or Majlis Kayu Malaysia. (Official site)
 Malaysian Timber Certification Council (MTCC), or Majlis Persijilan Kayu Malaysia. (Official site)

Key legislation
The Ministry of Plantation Industries and Commodities (MPIC) is responsible for administration of several key Acts.

See also

Ministers of Plantation Industries and Commodities (Malaysia)

References

External links
 Ministry of Plantation Industries and Commodities (MPIC)
 

Federal ministries, departments and agencies of Malaysia
Malaysia
Malaysia
Malaysia
Ministries established in 2004
2004 establishments in Malaysia
Agricultural organisations based in Malaysia